15 Park Avenue is a 2005 English-language Indian film directed by Aparna Sen. It stars Shabana Azmi, Konkona Sen Sharma, Soumitra Chatterjee, Waheeda Rehman, Dhritiman Chatterjee, Rahul Bose and Kanwaljeet Singh.It won the National Film Award for Best Feature Film in English.

Plot
30-something Mitali aka Meethi (Konkona Sen Sharma) has schizophrenia and is taken care of by her older, divorced sister Anjali aka Anu (Shabana Azmi), who is a professor, and their ageing mother (Waheeda Rehman). Although she was never married in real life, Meethi has created her own alternate reality in her mind in which she married her ex-fiancé Joydeep (Rahul Bose) and has five children. While Anu has dedicated her life to taking care of Meethi and her mother, even putting her own relationship with a fellow professor (Kanwaljeet Singh) on hold, in Meethi's imaginary world both the older women are holding her in the house and away from her husband and children against her will. She imagines her family to be living at the non-existent 15 Park Avenue in Kolkata.

After Meethi has a severe seizure, her case is taken up by a new doctor Kunal Barua (Dhritiman Chatterjee). While discussing her sister's case with the new doctor, Anu reveals that though Meethi had dormant schizophrenic traits since childhood, she led a very normal life until her early 20s, before a traumatic experience in the course of her job as a journalist made her withdraw from the outer world. Her fiancé, unable to deal with the emotional upheaval caused by the incidence, broke off the engagement. On the doctor's advice, Anu takes both women on a vacation to Bhutan, where they are spotted by Joydeep, now married with two children. In her present state, Meethi does not recognize Joydeep as the same man she is married to in her imagination, and befriends him. When Joydeep learns of Meethi's worsened condition and her imaginary world, he offers to help her locate the elusive family home - 15 Park Avenue.

Back in Kolkata, Joydeep drives her down to the part of the city where she believes her house and her family are. In a surrealistic climax, Meethi finally locates the house and finds her husband Jojo (as she fondly calls him) and her five children waiting for her return. She walks into the house, reunited with her 'real' family and is never seen again.

Cast
Shabana Azmi as Anjali
Konkona Sen Sharma as Meethi
Soumitra Chatterjee as Meethi's father
Waheeda Rehman as Meethi's and Anjali's mother
Rahul Bose as Joydeep Roy
Dhritiman Chaterji as Dr. Kunal Barua
Kanwaljit Singh as Anjali's colleague and boyfriend
Shefali Shah as Lakshmi, Joydeep's wife
Suranjana Dasgupta as Madwoman on the street
Dipavali Mehta as Child Meethi
Sunil Mukherjee as Witchdoctor

References

External links

2005 films
2005 drama films
Indian drama films
English-language Indian films
Fictional portrayals of schizophrenia
Films set in Kolkata
Best English Feature Film National Film Award winners
Films directed by Aparna Sen
2000s English-language films